Promyrmekiaphila is a genus of North American mygalomorph spiders in the family Euctenizidae. The genus was first described by E. Schenkel in 1950.  it contains only two species, both found in the United States: Promyrmekiaphila clathrata and Promyrmekiaphila winnemem.

References

Euctenizidae
Mygalomorphae genera
Spiders of the United States